Stradella is a Grand Opera in five acts by Louis Niedermeyer to a libretto by Emile Deschamps and Émilien Pacini. Based on a highly romanticized version of the life of the composer Alessandro Stradella (1639–1682), it was premiered at the  Paris Opera on 3 March 1837.

Background
The storyline of the opera is fashioned from the fanciful legend told by Pierre Bourdelot in his 1715 Histoire de la musique. Interest in Stradella in Paris had been growing in 1830s Paris, after the musician François-Joseph Fétis had included an aria, (supposedly by Stradella but actually by Fétis himself), in an 1833 concert; the melody soon became extremely popular. Moreover, a vaudeville with music by Flotow on the same subject opened in Paris a month before Niedermeyer's opera.

The opera was Niedermeyer's first venture in the Grand Opera vein. The leading roles were taken by two of the Opera's strongest singers, Adolphe Nourrit and Cornélie Falcon, both then at the height of their careers. However for both of them it represented some of their last appearances in Paris singing full operatic roles.

Falcon lost her voice catastrophically during the second performance of Stradella at the Opéra in March 1837. When Nourrit as Stradella asked her "Demain nous partirons – voulez-vous?", Falcon was unable to sing her line "Je suis prête", fainted, and was carried offstage by Nourrit. Hector Berlioz, who was present, describes "raucous sounds like those of a child with croup, guttural, whistling notes that quickly faded like those of a flute filled with water". Her career never recovered from this  disaster, and after 1840 she never performed publicly again. Nourrit gave a farewell performance in April 1837 after the first performances of Stradella, and later that year travelled to Italy, where he committed suicide in 1839.

The opera had a mixed reception. In a letter Berlioz was more frank than he would be in a review, saying: "In a few days' time I have to find a way of writing indulgent nonsense about an appalling non-work called Stradella, of which I saw a rehearsal yesterday evening at the Opéra. A thousand reasons force me to, quite apart from the fact that it would not be decent, in my position, to slate a young composer [Niedermeyer] who has for a long time been in the same situation vis-à-vis the theatre as I am. But I must warn you not to believe a word I say." The opera was revised to suit Gilbert Duprez when he took over the title role from Nourrit in 1837, and successfully revived in a three-act form in 1840. It is now almost totally forgotten.

Roles
{| class="wikitable"
!Role
!Voice type
!Premiere Cast,
!Premiere Cast September 1840
|-
||Alessandro Stradella, maestro and singer
|tenor
|Adolphe Nourrit
|Marié
|-
|Léonor, young orphan, fiancée of Stradella
|soprano
|Cornélie Falcon
|Rosine Stoltz
|-
|Ginevra, mother of Beppo|
|Gosselin
| —
|-
|Duke of Pesaro, patrician and senator|bass
|Prosper Dérivis
|Adolphe Alizard
|-
|Spadoni, servant of the Duke|bass
|Nicolas Levasseur
|Nicolas Levasseur
|-
|Beppo, student and friend of Stradella|baritone
|Ferdinand Prévôt
|Mme Widemann
|-
|Piétro, a hired assassin|tenor
|François Wartel
|François Wartel
|-
|Michael, a hired assassin|baritone
|Jean-Étienne-Auguste Massol
|Jean-Étienne-Auguste Massol
|-
|An officer
|
|Charpentier
|Ferdinand Prévôt
|-
| colspan="4"|Chorus: citizens, pilgrims, strolling players, etc.|}

Synopsis
The opera takes place in Venice and Rome, about 1660.

In Act I, in Venice, Stradella shields Léonor who is pursued by the Duke of Pesaro. They plan to flee together but the Duke recaptures Léonor. In Act II Stradella rescues Léonor from the Duke by threatening him with a pistol. Act III takes place in Rome during Holy Week, where Stradella is to sing during the celebrations amongst the pilgrims. Léonor rejects an offer of marriage from the Duke, conveyed by Spadoni, who secures two assassins to murder Stradella, but Stradella's singing of his hymn ('Pleure, Jérusalem') in the church of Santa Mara Maggiore so moves them that they drop their daggers and flee. In Act IV, preparing to be crowned with laurel for his singing and to marry Léonor, Stradella is captured by the Duke and conveyed again to Venice. In Act V, the Duke becomes Doge of Venice, and condemns Stradella to execution. However he is forced to relent by the pleas of Léonor and of the people.

External links

References
Notes

Sources
 Cairns, David (1999). Berlioz. Volume Two. Servitude and greatness 1832–1869. Berkeley, California: University of California Press. .
 Chouquet, Gustave (1873). Histoire de la musique dramatique en France (in French). Paris: Didot. View at Google Books.
 Deschamps, Émile; Pacini, Émilien (1840). Stradella (libretto). Paris: Pacini. View at Gallica.
 Ferchault, Guy and Jacqueline Gachet, Niedermeyer, Louis in Grove Music Online, (subscription only, consulted on 14.6.2011)
 Hibberd, Sarah (2009). French Grand Opera and the Historical Imagination, Cambridge: Cambridge University Press. .
 Smart, Mary Ann (2003).  "Roles, reputations,shadows: singers at the Opéra, 1828-1849", in The Cambridge Companion to Grand Opera'', ed. David Charlton, Cambridge:Cambridge University Press , pp. 108–128.

Operas
Grand operas
1837 operas
French-language operas
Operas by Louis Niedermeyer
Operas set in Italy
Opera world premieres at the Paris Opera
Operas set in Venice